= Mattéo Brondy =

French painter

Alphonse Clément André Brondy, known as Mattéo Brondy, (April 9, 1886 in Paris -1944 in Meknes, Morocco) was a French military veterinarian and painter.

Brondy is best known for the paintings of Morocco that became travel posters. His first works, exhibited from 1909 at the Salon des Indépendants and the French Artists Salon, met with success (animal studies, landscapes of Italy, Portugal, Spain).

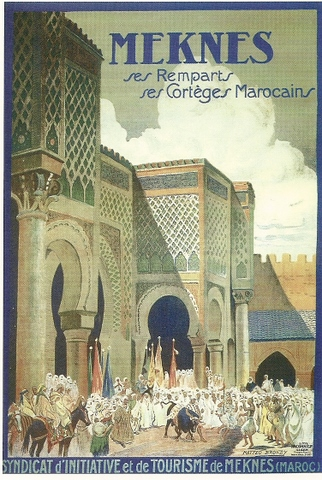

== Works ==
- Fantasia devant la casbah
- Meknes 'Ses Remparts - Ses Cortèges Marocains' (1927)
- Fantasia au Maroc [Fantasia in Morocco]
- Chameaux sur la route de Meknès
- Moulay-Idriss La Ville Sainte Du Djebel Zehroun
